Star Trek: Voyager is an American science fiction television series that aired from January 1995 to May 2001. The series won various awards and nominations for their cast, writers and the series itself.

ADG Excellence in Production Design Awards

American Latino Media Arts Awards

Art Directors Guild

ASCAP Film and Television Music Awards

Cinema Audio Society of America Awards

Emmy Awards
In an effort to gain a nomination for a dramatic category following the final season, adverts were taken out in Variety magazine to encourage voters to select Voyager.

Hollywood Makeup Artist and Hair Stylist Guild Awards

Golden Satellite Awards

Saturn Awards

Other awards

See also
List of Star Trek: The Original Series awards and nominations
List of Star Trek: The Next Generation awards and nominations
List of Star Trek: Deep Space Nine awards and nominations
List of Star Trek: Enterprise awards and nominations
List of Star Trek: Discovery awards and nominations

References

External links
 Awards for Star Trek: Voyager at IMDb

Voyager
Awards